Ghari Momin is a small village, which is connected through Akbarpura town, located in Nowshera, Rajouri district of the Indian union territory of Jammu and Kashmir.

References

Villages in Rajouri district